Padma Ram is an Indian politician. He is a Member of Legislative Assembly from Chohtan constituency Rajasthan, leader of the Indian National Congress.

References 

Living people
1963 births
Indian National Congress politicians
Rajasthani politicians
Rajasthan MLAs 2008–2013
Rajasthan MLAs 2018–2023
Indian National Congress politicians from Rajasthan